Cerodrillia carminura is a species of sea snail, a marine gastropod mollusk in the family Drilliidae.

Description
The shell grows to a length of 12 mm, its diameter 4 mm.

The shell has seven whorls beside the protoconch. It is of a lemonade color. It shows nine ribs on the penultimate whorl, rather straighter than in the type Cerodrillia thea and less swollen on the periphery.

Distribution
This marine species occurs in deep water in the Gulf of Mexico and off West Florida and Barbados.

References

External links
 
 Rosenberg G., Moretzsohn F. & García E. F. (2009). Gastropoda (Mollusca) of the Gulf of Mexico, pp. 579–699 in Felder, D.L. and D.K. Camp (eds.), Gulf of Mexico–Origins, Waters, and Biota. Biodiversity. Texas A&M Press, College Station, Texas
 Fallon P.J. (2016). Taxonomic review of tropical western Atlantic shallow water Drilliidae (Mollusca: Gastropoda: Conoidea) including descriptions of 100 new species. Zootaxa. 4090(1): 1-363

carminura
Gastropods described in 1889